Sympistis dentata, the toothed apharetra moth, is a moth of the family Noctuidae described by Augustus Radcliffe Grote in 1875. It is found from Yukon, the Northwest Territories, and British Columbia to Newfoundland and the northern United States, south in the east to New Jersey. It is listed as threatened in the US state of Connecticut.

Host plants
Larvae feed on Vaccinium and Kalmia polifolia.

References

dentata
Moths described in 1875